Cipriano Ricardo Flores Magón (known as Ricardo Flores Magón; September 16, 1874 – November 21, 1922) was a Mexican anarchist and social reform activist. His brothers Enrique and Jesús were also active in politics. Followers of the Flores Magón brothers were known as Magonistas. He has been considered an important participant in the social movement that sparked the Mexican Revolution.

Biography 

Ricardo was born on 16 September 1874, in San Antonio Eloxochitlán, Oaxaca, an indigenous Mazatec community. His father, Teodoro Flores, was a Zapotec Indian and his mother, Margarita Magón was a Mestiza. The couple met each other in 1863 during the Siege of Puebla when both were carrying munitions to the Mexican troops.

Magón explored the writings and ideas of many early anarchists, such as Mikhail Bakunin and Pierre-Joseph Proudhon, but was also influenced by anarchist contemporaries Élisée Reclus, Charles Malato, Errico Malatesta, Anselmo Lorenzo, Emma Goldman, and Fernando Tarrida del Mármol. He was most influenced by Peter Kropotkin. He also read from the works of Karl Marx and Henrik Ibsen.

He was one of the major thinkers of the Mexican Revolution and the Mexican revolutionary movement in the Partido Liberal Mexicano. Flores Magón organised with the Industrial Workers of the World (IWW) and edited the Mexican anarchist newspaper Regeneración, which aroused the workers against the dictatorship of Porfirio Díaz.

Kropotkin's The Conquest of Bread, which Flores Magón considered a kind of anarchist bible, served as basis for the short-lived revolutionary communes in Baja California during the "Magonista" Revolt of 1911.

The Magón brothers were from a family of modest means in Oaxaca and all three studied law at the Escuela Nacional de Jurisprudencia  (today Faculty of Law of the UNAM). Ricardo initially attended the Escuela Nacional Preparatoria. During this time, he participated in student opposition to President Porfirio Diaz and he was jailed for five months. Nevertheless, he graduated and then transferred to the National School of Law. While there, he worked as a proofreader for the student newspaper El Demócrata and narrowly escaped arrest when the entire staff was arrested by the police. He was in hiding for three months but continued his studies and received his law degree in 1895 and passed the examination of the Barra Mexicana-Colegio de Abogados (Mexican Bar and Advocate's College). He practiced law for a short time and continued to study for a higher degree but was expelled from the school in 1898 because of his political activities. In 1900, he and his brother Jesús founded the newspaper Regeneración in which Ricardo wrote numerous articles attacking Diaz. He also wrote articles for the opposition periodicals Excelsior, La República Mexicana, and El Hijo del Ahuizote.  He joined the PLM in 1900.

Flight to the United States

In 1904, Magón fled Mexico when the courts banned the printing of his writings and he remained in the United States for the remainder of his life.  Half this period was spent in prison. He resumed publication of Regeneración and led the  Partido Liberal Mexicano (PLM) (Mexican Liberal Party) from abroad. In 1906, he went to California. Around this time PLM uprisings occurred in Mexico which were crushed by the Mexican government. The US sympathized with the Mexican government and started taking PLM leaders in the US into custody. Magón was fearful that he would be caught and be returned to Mexico, where he faced the possibility of execution.

In 1907, an American detective by the name of Thomas Furlong was employed by Enrique Creel, at that time governor of Chihuahua, to locate Mexican dissidents in the U.S. The American headquarters of the PLM was in St. Louis at that time. There were a large number of expatriates who knew of its whereabouts and as a result, Furlong had no difficulty locating the dissidents in the city. Magón, however, was living in great secrecy in Los Angeles. He used a pseudonym, and only two other persons in the city knew his real identity. If they needed to see him, they did so between midnight and dawn. The dissidents in St. Louis soon became aware that they were being sought by agents working for the Mexican government. Librado Rivera left the city in order to evade capture and although he was constantly on alert for agents who might be shadowing him, he failed to elude them. He was followed to Los Angeles and to Magón's place of residence.  Furlong kept the house under surveillance for some time. Finally, on August 23, 1907, Magón, Rivera and Antonio Villarreal were taken into custody by Furlong, two of his assistants and some officers from the Los Angeles police department.

Magón and other PLM members had organized a brigade of revolutionaries in Douglas, Arizona in the years preceding his move to Los Angeles. An expedition was sent to the Cananea copper mines about thirty miles from the southern border of Arizona with the alleged intention of exterminating all Americans employed in and about the mines. The brigade had been pursued by the Arizona Rangers who put them to flight, capturing a few of them. Magón and his companions were extradited to Tombstone, Arizona where they were charged with violating U.S. neutrality laws. Although the American and Mexican left rallied to their defense, they were convicted and sentenced to eighteen months in Yuma Territorial Prison, later being transferred to Arizona State Prison Complex – Florence. They were released in 1910 and again resumed publishing Regeneración from an office in downtown Los Angeles. The Mexican Civil War began that same year, and the Magonistas, as the PLM forces were known, were involved in combat throughout Mexico, along with the forces of Pancho Villa, Emiliano Zapata and Venustiano Carranza and Francisco I. Madero.

By May 1911, Diaz was defeated. Madero organized an election, which he won by deceiving the Mexican electorate into believing that he had joined forces with the PLM. Magón continued to oppose the vast American economic presence in Mexico, and Madero's continuing expropriation of peasant lands. He was arrested again. After two years in prison in Washington state, he was released and settled with brother Enrique in Edendale, just north of the Silver Lake Reservoir. The PLM had no funds by this time, and the brothers and their friends farmed and raised chickens on the rented plot of land. He continued publishing Regeneración and making speeches in the region. One of the places Magon stayed was in the city of El Monte, part of the San Gabriel Valley in Los Angeles County. During his time in El Monte, Magon wrote letters to comrades in Mexico, as well was involved in local anarchist activities while supporting himself and family picking up work in local ranches in the area. He was again arrested in 1916, accused of sending "indecent materials" through the U.S. Mail. With the help of Emma Goldman, he made bail. 

In 1918, he published an anti-war manifesto. In this he wrote, "The death of the old order is at hand. It is being whispered in the bars, theatres, streetcars and homes, especially in our homes, the homes of those at the bottom." For these writings, he was charged with sedition under the Espionage Act of 1917, convicted and sentenced to twenty years for "obstructing the war effort", a violation of the Espionage Act of 1917. The Wilson administration conducted what were called the Palmer Raids, a wholesale crackdown on war dissidents and leftists that also swept up notable socialists such as Eugene V. Debs. Magón died at Leavenworth Penitentiary in Kansas. He had been suffering from diabetes for many years and was losing his eyesight by the time of his death.

The cause of Flores Magón's death has been disputed.  Some believe that he was deliberately murdered by prison guards. Others contend that he died as a result of deteriorating health caused by his long imprisonment, possibly exacerbated by medical neglect by Leavenworth Penitentiary officials and staff. Magón wrote several letters to friends complaining of debilitating health problems and of what he perceived to be purposeful neglect by the prison staff.

The Mexican Chamber of Deputies adopted a resolution requesting the repatriation of Magón's body. It stated,

The U.S. authorities denied the request and Magón was buried in Los Angeles. His remains were finally repatriated in 1945 and interred at the Rotunda of Illustrious Persons in Mexico City.

Legacy 

Flores Magón's movement fired the imagination of both American and Mexican anarchists. In 1945, his remains were repatriated to Mexico and were interred in the Rotonda de los Hombres Ilustres in Mexico City. In Mexico, the Flores Magón brothers are considered left-wing political icons nearly as notable as Emiliano Zapata; numerous streets, public schools, towns and neighborhoods are named after them. His ideas have also inspired indigenous leaders from Oaxaca, Mexico including the Chatino leader Tomas Cruz Lorenzo.

In 1991, Douglas Day published The Prison Notebooks of Ricardo Flores Magón, a fictional diary covering Flores Magon's life from his birth in Oaxaca until his mysterious death in his cell at Leavenworth.

In 1997, an organization of indigenous peoples of Mexico in the state of Oaxaca formed the Popular Indigenous Council of Oaxaca "Ricardo Flores Magón" (Consejo Indígena Popular de Oaxaca "Ricardo Flores Magón", or CIPO-RFM), based on the philosophy of Magón.

Playwright 
In his work of popular education, Ricardo Flores Magón also used the theater to denounce the faults of society and outline the main lines of the libertarian "program". He is the author of two plays: Verdugos et victimas and Tierra y Libertad. He is also the author of numerous tales, published in the newspaper Regeneración.

See also 
Magonism
Magonista rebellion of 1911
Popular Indigenous Council of Oaxaca "Ricardo Flores Magón"
Liberalism in Mexico
Anarchism in Mexico
 William C. Owen, an anarchist editor who worked with Magón

Notes

References

Further reading

External links 

 
 Complete Works (mostly in Spanish) 
 Ricardo Flores Magón in English and Spanish
 Death of a Political Prisoner: Revisiting the Case of Ricardo Flores Magón
 Historic Sites of Magón's travels in exile, including addresses in Laredo, San Antonio, Saint Louis, El Paso, Los Angeles, Tucson, Tombstone, and prisons in Yuma, Florence (AZ), McNeil Island (WA), and Leavenworth (KS) (site in progress)
 
 Secretaria de Relaciones Exteriores de Mexico. Ricardo Flores Magón Documents MSS 582. Special Collections & Archives, UC San Diego Library.

1874 births
1922 deaths
Anarcho-communists
Anarchism in Mexico
History of Baja California
Industrial Workers of the World members
Magonists
Male journalists
Mexican anarchists
Mexican atheists
Mexican journalists
Mexican people imprisoned abroad
Mexican people who died in prison custody
Mexican rebels
Mexican revolutionaries
People from Oaxaca
People of the Mexican Revolution
Porfiriato
People convicted under the Espionage Act of 1917
Prisoners who died in United States federal government detention
Murdered anarchists
Death conspiracy theories